Trams in Finland date from a horse-drawn Turku tramway network, which opened in 1890. Electric tramway traction started in Finland in 1900 with the introduction of electric trams in Helsinki, and the last horse-drawn trams were withdrawn from operation in 1917. Although there were three Finnish tramway networks between 1912 and World War II, by 1972 the number of networks had dwindled to just one, that of Helsinki, which remained Finland's only tramway network for almost 50 years. However, in August 2021, a light rail line was opened to the public in Tampere. There have also been proposals to set up tram or light rail networks in some other cities. As of 2021, the most concrete such plans are in Turku.

History

Helsinki 

In Helsinki, horse trams operated between 1890 and 1901. Since 1900, electric trams have operated there.

For part of its existence, the Helsinki tramway network has been supplemented by a trolleybus line: in 1949–1974, and on a trial basis in 1979–1985.

Between 1913 and 1917 there was a short-lived horse-drawn tramway in Lauttasaari, an island that was a part of the  Helsinki Rural Municipality and since 1920 the municipality of Huopalahti, which was later merged into Helsinki.

The Kulosaari, and Haaga municipalities also had a tramway that belonged to the Helsinki tram network.

Turku 

In Turku, there were horse-drawn trams from 1890 to 1892, and electric trams from 1908 to 1972. The tram network was abandoned in 1972, when the last remaining tram line was replaced by buses.

The arguments against the Turku tramway were associated with the 1960s view that trams were an outdated mode of transport, while buses were seen as modern technology. The decision to close the Turku tramway network can also be seen in part as inspired by events in Stockholm, which had closed most of its tramway network a little earlier.

The municipalities of Kaarina and Maaria in the Turku region had a tramway that belonged to the Turku tram network.

Viipuri 

Trams began running in Viipuri, then a part of the Grand Duchy of Finland, in 1912. They were electrically operated from the start.

Following the cession of the city to the Soviet Union during World War II, the tramway network remained in service until 1957.

Other tramways 
Some narrow gauge Finnish railways with mostly or only freight traffic have been called "tramways".

These railways include industrial lines, such as the "freight tram" in Tampere (from Finlayson to Santalahti woodyard a few kilometres away), which closed in 1957, the railway in Mustio (a freight line from the railway station to the mill), which closed in 1964 and the Kyröskoski industrial railway in Hämeenkyrö (Finland's last narrow gauge industrial railway), which closed in 1989. The harbour railway in Lohja, which was Finland's first electric railway, running from the state railway station to the port, carried both passenger and freight services but closed in 1930.

Today

Helsinki 
The most recent line opening since 1976 took place in August 2008, when line 9 was opened, initially running from Kolmikulma to Itä-Pasila. Line 9 was later extended to run to the newly developed harbour area of Jätkäsaari.

Tampere 
Since August 2021, there has been a tram system in Tampere, consisting of two intersecting lines.

Projects

Helsinki 

In the Helsinki region, there are plans to expand the tramway network, through a large project called Raidejokeri. This planned expansion will become the first light rail line in Helsinki when opened. Currently, the Jokeri line is bus line 550, which will be replaced by the cross-city light rail line similar to Stockholm's Tvärbanan. The Raidejokeri will dramatically extend the Helsinki tramway network, as its entire length runs outside of the existing tram network. This will be the first tramway network to serve the city of Espoo.

The Jokeri line runs from the site of the metro station at Aalto-yliopisto and Keilaniemi, Espoo in the west to the Itäkeskus metro station, Helsinki in the east. It also offers interchange with commuter and long-distance rail services in Leppävaara, Espoo and Oulunkylä and Huopalahti, Helsinki.

The Helsinki tramway network is being extended to Jätkäsaari south of Ruoholahti, and Laajasalo east of the city centre, through a series of bridges across the islands including Korkeasaari, in a project known as the Crown Bridges.

Tampere 

The construction of the Tampere light rail system started in 2017, with the first two lines being completed in August 2021. Further extensions to the system are underway, with the section from Pyynikintori to Santalahti being scheduled for opening in 2023.

Turku 
In Turku, the newest light rail plan was approved as part of the Turku area public inquiry for the period to 2020. In December 2009, the Turku City Council decided that "light rail will be built for the routes that are heavily congested, when the financial plan and related conditions, and government financing and the proportions that the other municipalities within the region will pay for construction, have been agreed." As of 2020, the Turku municipal council was researching the best path for the first new tram line in the city.

There have also been proposals to build a heritage tramway in Turku that would run during the summer season along the Aura River between the Turku Castle and Martinsilta (St Martin's Bridge), and later also to the Market Square, in perhaps the most attractive part of Turku. The old tram depot (with a few old, restored cars in operating condition) is on Linnankatu, a stone's throw from the castle and the river. The route would be relatively short, and the tramway would therefore be relatively inexpensive to build. The Museum Tram initiative is pending in the Turku city administration, but has not been progressed since 2005.

Light rail proposals 
There are proposals to introduce light rail in a number of Finnish cities, such as Oulu, Pori, Jyväskylä, Kouvola, Pieksämäki, and also in Espoo and Vantaa, cities belonging to Greater Helsinki, whose systems would probably be built to be compatible with the Helsinki tramway network.

See also 

 History of rail transport in Finland
 List of town tramway systems in Finland
 Rail transport in Finland
 Trams in Europe

References

External links 

 Finnish Tramway Society - official website 
 Kaupunkiliikenne - website about modern tramways from a Finnish perspective